"The Ocean" is a song by English rock band Led Zeppelin, from their 1973 album Houses of the Holy. The ocean is a metaphor for the "sea of heads" faced by lead singer Robert Plant "in the auditoriums", according to the group's biographer Dave Lewis.

Overview
Eddie Kramer, who was present during the recording of Houses of the Holy, commented on extraneous noises in the recording: "It's entirely possible. [The song was] done in a house [but] I don't remember there being [a phone ringing]." Jimmy Page remarked:

The introduction, "We've done four already, and now we're steady" is done by John Bonham. He is referring to the previous four recording takes, and the one on the record presumably is the fifth take of the session. The song finishes with a "fifties rock 'n' roll sequence" complete with "doo-wops", that bears no relationship to the previous part of the song.

Live performances
In the last line, the "girl who won my heart" refers to Robert Plant's daughter Carmen, (born 21 November 1968), who was three years old at the time of recording. In concert, Plant always updated the lyric to reflect her current age, as captured on the Led Zeppelin DVD which features a performance of the song at Madison Square Garden in 1973. During this performance, Plant sang the third verse, which starts with "Sitting round singing songs 'til the night turns into day" as the second verse and sang the second verse at the end of the song. The band first played the song live on their 1972 U.S. concert tour and it remained as part of their performances through their 1973 U.S. tour. It was deleted from the set list thereafter.

Reception
In a review for the reissue of Houses of the Holy, Kristofer Lenz of Consequence of Sound gave "The Ocean" a positive review, calling the song "clattering and demonstrative... [an] underappreciated gem". Lenz continues, "Page and co. get back to their swaggering rock roots with one of the nastiest guitar riff/drum fill combos in rock history." and "The song and album end with a riotous crescendo as Plant screams out "Ohhhh, so gooood!" And he is soooo right."

However, not all the reception for the song was as positive. In a contemporary review for Houses of the Holy, Gordon Fletcher of Rolling Stone gave "The Ocean" a negative review, calling the track "so diluted" and filled with "pointless humor". Fletcher further wrote, "Jimmy Page's guitar spits jagged fireballs with John Paul Jones and John Bonham riffing along behind him, but the effect is destroyed by ridiculous backup cooings and an overbearing "killer" coda that's so blatant it can only be taken as a mock of straight rock & roll."

Released as single in Germany, "The Ocean" reached number eight in the chart.

See also
List of cover versions of Led Zeppelin songs "The Ocean" entries

References

External links
"The Ocean" (Live: NY 1973) at ledzeppelin.com

1973 songs
Atlantic Records singles
Led Zeppelin songs
Song recordings produced by Jimmy Page
Songs written by Jimmy Page
Songs written by John Bonham
Songs written by John Paul Jones (musician)
Songs written by Robert Plant